Lukergunj is a place in Allahabad, India. Built in 1906 initially for the Government Press employees, it is a posh residential area. Lukergunj, well known for its clubbing culture, was once predominantly occupied by British and Anglo Indians. It is situated one kilometer south west from the Allahabad Railway Station.

References

Neighbourhoods in Allahabad